Cleopatra is a 2007 Brazilian epic historical drama film directed by Júlio Bressane. It stars Alessandra Negrini in the eponymous role.

Plot summary

Cast 
 Alessandra Negrini .... Cleopatra
 Miguel Falabella .... Julius Caesar
 Bruno Garcia .... Mark Antony
 Taumaturgo Ferreira .... Pothinus
 Heitor Martinez .... Augustus
 Lúcio Mauro .... Ptolemy XII Auletes
 Nildo Parente .... Priest Karabas
 Josie Antello .... Arsinoe III of Egypt

Release  
The film premiered at the Brasília Film Festival on November 23, 2007.

Filmed in Copacabana, Rio de Janeiro with cinematography by Walter Carvalho (from Central Station and Carandiru), Cleopatra is defined by the filmmaker as “a lyrical vision” of the persona of the last queen of ancient Egypt.

Awards 
2007: Festival de Brasília
Best Film (won)
Best Actress (Alessandra Negrini) (won)
Best Art Direction (Moa Batsow) (won) 
Best Cinematography (Walter Carvalho) (won)
Best Music (Guilherme Vaz) (won) 
Best Sound (Leandro Lima) (won)

References

External links 
 
 
 

2007 films
2000s Portuguese-language films
Brazilian drama films
Brazilian romance films
Depictions of Cleopatra on film
2007 drama films